The family Geometridae is represented by over 300 species in Great Britain.

Subfamily Archiearinae
 Archiearis parthenias, orange underwing — throughout (localized)
 Archiearis notha, light orange underwing —south (Nationally Scarce B)

Subfamily Alsophilinae

 Alsophila aescularia, March moth — throughout

Subfamily Geometrinae
 Aplasta ononaria, rest harrow — south-east (Red Data Book) ‡
 Pseudoterpna coronillaria, Jersey emerald — Jersey
 Pseudoterpna pruinata atropunctaria, grass emerald — throughout
 Geometra papilionaria, large emerald — throughout
 Comibaena bajularia, blotched emerald — south & centre (localized)
 Antonechloris smaragdaria maritima, Essex emerald — south-east, presumed extinct
 Hemithea aestivaria, common emerald — south & central
 Chlorissa viridata, small grass emerald — south & west-central (Nationally Scarce A)
 [Chlorochlamys chloroleucaria, blackberry looper — probable import]
 Thalera fimbrialis, Sussex emerald — south-east (Red Data Book) ‡
 Hemistola chrysoprasaria, small emerald — south & central (localized) (Vulnerable) ‡*
 Jodis lactearia, little emerald — south, central & north-west (localized)

Subfamily Sterrhinae

 Cyclophora pendularia, dingy mocha — south (Red Data Book) ‡
 Cyclophora annularia, mocha — south (Nationally Scarce B)
 Cyclophora albipunctata, birch mocha — throughout
 Cyclophora puppillaria, Blair's mocha — immigrant
 Cyclophora porata, false mocha — south & central (Nationally Scarce B) ‡
 Cyclophora punctaria, maiden's blush — south & central (localized)
 Cyclophora linearia, clay triple-lines —south & central (localized)
 Timandra comai, blood-vein — south & central; localized in north (Vulnerable) ‡*
 Scopula immorata, Lewes wave — probably extinct
 Scopula nigropunctata, sub-angled wave — south-east (Red Data Book)

 [Scopula virgulata, streaked wave — old, unconfirmed record]
 [Scopula decorata, middle lace border — unverified records]
 Scopula ornata, lace border — south (Nationally Scarce B)
 Scopula rubiginata, tawny wave — south-east (Red Data Book)
 Scopula marginepunctata, mullein wave — south, central & north (localized) (Vulnerable) ‡*
 Scopula imitaria, small blood-vein — south & central
 Scopula emutaria, rosy wave — south, east & west (Nationally Scarce B)
 Scopula immutata, lesser cream wave — south & central (localized)
 Scopula floslactata, cream wave
 Scopula floslactata floslactata — south & central (localized)
 Scopula floslactata f. scotica — north-west (localized)
 Scopula ternata, smoky wave — north & west (localized)
 [Scopula limboundata, large lace border — single, old, unconfirmed record]

 Idaea ochrata cantiata, bright wave — south-east (Red Data Book) ‡
 Idaea serpentata, ochraceous wave — rare immigrant [resident on Jersey]
 Idaea muricata, purple-bordered gold — south & central (Nationally Scarce B)
 Idaea rusticata atrosignaria, least carpet — south (localized)
 [Idaea laevigata, strange wave — probable import]
 Idaea sylvestraria, dotted-border wave — south & central (Nationally Scarce B)
 Idaea biselata, small fan-footed wave — throughout
 [Idaea inquinata, rusty wave — probable import]
 Idaea dilutaria, silky wave — west (Red Data Book) ‡
 Idaea fuscovenosa, dwarf cream wave — south & central (localized)
 Idaea humiliata, Isle of Wight wave — presumed extinct

 Idaea seriata, small dusty wave — south, central & north-east
 Idaea dimidiata, single-dotted wave — south, central & north-west
 Idaea subsericeata, satin wave — south & central
 Idaea contiguaria britanniae, Weaver's wave — west-central (Nationally Scarce A)
 Idaea trigeminata, treble brown spot — south (localized)
 Idaea emarginata, small scallop — south & central (localized)
 Idaea aversata, riband wave — throughout
 Idaea degeneraria, Portland ribbon wave — south coast & Isles of Scilly (Red Data Book)
 Idaea straminata, plain wave — throughout
 Rhodometra sacraria, Vestal — immigrant

Subfamily Larentiinae

 [Lythria purpuraria, purple-barred yellow — old, unconfirmed records]
 Phibalapteryx virgata, oblique striped south & west-central (Nationally Scarce B)
 Orthonama vittata, oblique carpet — throughout ‡*
 Orthonama obstipata, gem — immigrant
 Xanthorhoe biriviata, balsam carpet — south & south-east (uncommon)
 Xanthorhoe designata, flame carpet — throughout
 Xanthorhoe decoloraria, red carpet ‡*
 Xanthorhoe decoloraria hethlandica — Shetland
 Xanthorhoe decoloraria decoloraria — north & west
 Xanthorhoe spadicearia, red twin-spot carpet — throughout
 Xanthorhoe ferrugata, dark-barred twin-spot carpet — throughout (Endangered) ‡*
 Xanthorhoe quadrifasiata, large twin-spot carpet — south & central (localized)
 Xanthorhoe montanata, silver-ground carpet 
 Xanthorhoe montanata shetlandica — Shetland
 Xanthorhoe montanata montanata — throughout

 Xanthorhoe fluctuata fluctuata, garden carpet — throughout
 Scotopteryx moeniata, fortified carpet — probable rare immigrant (old records)
 Scotopteryx peribolata, Spanish sarpet — immigrant to south
 Scotopteryx bipunctaria cretata, chalk carpet — south & central (Nationally Scarce B) ‡
 Scotopteryx chenopodiata, shaded broad-bar — throughout (Vulnerable) ‡*
 Scotopteryx mucronata, lead belle
 Scotopteryx mucronata scotica — west-central & north (localized)
 Scotopteryx mucronata umbrifera — south-west (localized)
 Scotopteryx luridata plumbaria, July belle — throughout
 Catarhoe rubidata, ruddy carpet — south (Nationally Scarce B)
 Catarhoe cuculata, royal mantle — south & north (localized)
 Epirrhoe tristata, small argent and sable — north & west

 Epirrhoe alternata, common carpet
 Epirrhoe alternata obscurata — Outer Hebrides
 Epirrhoe alternata alternata — throughout
 Epirrhoe rivata, wood carpet — south & central (localized)
 Epirrhoe galiata, galium carpet — south, central & north (localized) (Vulnerable) ‡*
 Costaconvexa polygrammata, many-lined — extinct; rare immigrant
 [Costaconvexa centrostrigaria, traveller — probable import]
 Camptogramma bilineata, yellow shell
 Camptogramma bilineata bilineata — throughout
 Camptogramma bilineata atlantica — Shetland & Outer Hebrides

 Entephria flavicinctata, yellow-ringed carpet
 Entephria flavicinctata flavicinctata — west coast of Scotland & Inner Hebrides, Yorkshire Dales & Black Mountains (Nationally Scarce B)
 Entephria flavicinctata ruficinctata — central & north-west Scotland (localized)
 Entephria caesiata, grey mountain moth — west-central & north (Vulnerable) ‡*
 Larentia clavaria, mallow — south, central & north
 Anticlea badiata, shoulder stripe — south, central & north
 Anticlea derivata, streamer — throughout
 Mesoleuca albicillata, beautiful carpet — south, central & north

 Pelurga comitata, dark spinach — south, central & north (Endangered) ‡*
 Lampropteryx suffumata, water carpet — throughout
 Lampropteryx otregiata, Devon carpet — south & south-west (Nationally Scarce B)
 Cosmorhoe ocellata, purple bar — throughout
 Nebula salicata latentaria, striped twin-spot carpet — north, west & south-west
 Eulithis prunata, phoenix — throughout
 Eulithis testata, chevron — throughout
 Eulithis populata, northern spinach — south-west, west, central & north
 Eulithis mellinata, spinach — south, central & north
 Eulithis pyraliata, barred straw — throughout
 Ecliptopera silaceata, small phoenix — throughout (Vulnerable) ‡*
 Chloroclysta siterata, red–green carpet — throughout

 Chloroclysta miata, autumn green carpet — throughout (localized)
 Chloroclysta citrata, dark marbled carpet
 Chloroclysta citrata citrata — throughout
 Chloroclysta citrata pythonissata — Shetland & Orkney
 Chloroclysta concinnata, Arran carpet — north-west (Nationally Scarce A)
 Chloroclysta truncata, common marbled carpet — throughout
 Cidaria fulvata, barred yellow — throughout
 Plemyria rubiginata, blue-bordered carpet 
 Plemyria rubiginata rubiginata — south & central
 Plemyria rubiginata plumbata — north (localized)
 Thera firmata, pine carpet — throughout
 Thera obeliscata, grey pine carpet — throughout
 Thera britannica, spruce carpet — throughout
 Thera cognata, chestnut-coloured carpet — central & north (Nationally Scarce B)

 Thera juniperata, juniper carpet
 Thera juniperata juniperata — throughout
 Thera juniperata scotica —north (localized)
 Thera juniperata orcadensis — Orkney (possibly extinct)
 Thera cupressata, cypress carpet — south-east (uncommon)
 Eustroma reticulata, netted carpet — west-central (Red Data Book) ‡
 Electrophaes corylata, broken-barred carpet — throughout
 Colostygia olivata, beech-green carpet — north, west-central & south (localized)
 Colostygia multistrigaria, mottled grey — throughout
 Colostygia pectinataria, green carpet — throughout
 Hydriomena furcata, July highflyer — throughout
 Hydriomena impluviata, May highflyer — throughout
 Hydriomena ruberata, ruddy highflyer —north, west, south & east (localized)
 Coenocalpe lapidata, slender-striped rufous — north (Nationally Scarce A)
 Horisme vitalbata, small waved umber — south & central
 Horisme tersata, fern — south & central
 [Horisme aquata, Cumbrian umber — dubious record]
 Melanthia procellata, pretty chalk carpet — south & central (Vulnerable) ‡*
 Pareulype berberata, barberry carpet — south (Red Data Book) ‡
 Spargania luctuata, white-banded carpet — south-east (Nationally Scarce A)
 Rheumaptera hastata, argent and sable ‡
 Rheumaptera hastata hastata — south & central (Nationally Scarce B)
 Rheumaptera hastata f. nigrescens — north (Nationally Scarce B)
 Rheumaptera cervinalis, scarce tissue — south & central (localized)
 Rheumaptera undulata, scallop shell — south, central & north (localized)
 Triphosa dubitata, tissue — south & central (localized)
 Philereme vetulata, brown scallop — south (not south-west) & central (localized)
 Philereme transversata britannica, dark umber — south (not south-west) & central (localized)
 Euphyia biangulata, cloaked carpet — west, south & south-east (Nationally Scarce B)
 Euphyia unangulata, sharp-angled carpet — south (localized)
 Epirrita dilutata, November moth — throughout
 Epirrita christyi, pale November moth — south, central & north
 Epirrita autumnata, autumnal moth — throughout
 Epirrita filigrammaria, small autumnal moth — north, central & west

 Operophtera brumata, winter moth — throughout
 Operophtera fagata, northern winter moth — throughout
 Perizoma taeniata, barred carpet — central & north (Nationally Scarce A)
 Perizoma affinitata, rivulet — throughout

 Perizoma alchemillata, small rivulet — throughout
 Perizoma bifaciata, barred rivulet — south, central & north (localized)
 Perizoma minorata ericetata, heath rivulet — north & central (Nationally Scarce B)
 Perizoma blandiata, pretty pinion 
 Perizoma blandiata blandiata — north & west (local)
 Perizoma blandiata perfasciata — Hebrides & Rùm
 Perizoma albulata, grass rivulet (Endangered) ‡*
 Perizoma albulata albulata — throughout (localized)
 Perizoma albulata subfasciaria — Shetland
 Perizoma flavofasciata, sandy carpet — throughout
 Perizoma didymata, twin-spot carpet 
 Perizoma didymata didymata — throughout
 Perizoma didymata hethlandica — Shetland
 Perizoma sagittata, marsh carpet — east-central (Nationally Scarce A)
 Eupithecia tenuiata, slender pug — throughout
 Eupithecia inturbata, maple pug — south & central (localized)
 Eupithecia haworthiata, Haworth's pug — south & central (localized)
 Eupithecia plumbeolata, lead-coloured pug — south, central & north-west (Nationally Scarce B)
 Eupithecia abietaria, cloaked pug — throughout
 Eupithecia linariata, toadflax pug — throughout
 Eupithecia pulchellata, foxglove pug 
 Eupithecia pulchellata pulchellata — throughout
 Eupithecia pulchellata hebudium — Wales & Hebrides
 Eupithecia irriguata, marbled pug — south (Nationally Scarce B)
 Eupithecia exiguata, mottled pug 
 Eupithecia exiguata exiguata — throughout
 Eupithecia exiguata muricolor — Aberdeenshire
 Eupithecia insigniata, pinion-spotted pug — south (not south-west) & central (Nationally Scarce B)
 Eupithecia valerianata, valerian pug — throughout (Nationally Scarce B)
 Eupithecia pygmaeata, marsh pug — south, central & north (Nationally Scarce B)
 Eupithecia venosata, netted pug 
 Eupithecia venosata venosata — south, central & north-east (localized)
 Eupithecia venosata hebridensis — Hebrides
 Eupithecia venosata fumosae — Shetland & Orkney
 Eupithecia venosata ochracae — Orkney
 Eupithecia egenaria, Fletcher's (pauper) pug — south-west & east (Red Data Book)
 Eupithecia centaureata, lime-speck pug — throughout
 Eupithecia trisignaria, triple-spotted pug — throughout (localized)
 Eupithecia intricata
 Eupithecia intricata millieraria, Edinburgh pug — north
 Eupithecia intricata arceuthata, Freyer's pug — south & central
 Eupithecia satyrata, satyr pug
 Eupithecia satyrata callunaria — south (localized)
 Eupithecia satyrata satyrata — north (moorlands)
 Eupithecia satyrata curzoni — Shetland
 [Eupithecia cauchiata, Doubleday's pug — single old record, Essex]
 Eupithecia absinthiata, wormwood pug — throughout
 Eupithecia absinthiata f. goossensiata, ling pug — throughout (localized, especially heathland and moorland)
 Eupithecia assimilata, currant pug — throughout
 Eupithecia expallidata, bleached pug — south-east, west & north (Nationally Scarce B)
 Eupithecia vulgata, common pug
 Eupithecia vulgata vulgata — south & central
 Eupithecia vulgata scotica — north
 Eupithecia tripunctaria, white-spotted pug — south, central & north (localized)
 Eupithecia denotata
 Eupithecia denotata denotata, campanula pug — south & east (Nationally Scarce A)
 Eupithecia denotata jasioneata, jasione pug — south-west & west-central (Nationally Scarce A)
 Eupithecia subfuscata, grey pug — throughout
 Eupithecia icterata subfulvata, tawny speckled pug — throughout
 Eupithecia succenturiata, bordered pug — south, central & north
 Eupithecia subumbrata, shaded pug — throughout (localized)
 Eupithecia millefoliata, yarrow pug — south-east (Nationally Scarce B)
 Eupithecia simpliciata, plain pug — south & central (localized)
 Eupithecia sinuosaria, goosefoot pug — probable rare immigrant
 Eupithecia distinctaria constrictata, thyme pug — throughout (except south-east) (Nationally Scarce B)
 Eupithecia indigata, ochreous pug — throughout
 Eupithecia pimpinellata, pimpinel pug — south & central (localized)
 Eupithecia nanata, narrow-winged pug — throughout
 Eupithecia extensaria occidua, scarce pug — east-central (Red Data Book) ‡
 Eupithecia innotata, angle-barred pug — throughout
 Eupithecia fraxinata, ash pug — throughout
 Eupithecia tamarisciata, tamarisk pug — south (uncommon on alien Tamarisk)

 Eupithecia virgaureata, golden-rod pug — west & east (localized)
 Eupithecia abbreviata, brindled pug — throughout

 Eupithecia dodoneata, oak-tree pug —south & central 
 Eupithecia pusillata, juniper pug
 Eupithecia pusillata pusillata — throughout
 Eupithecia pusillata anglicata — extinct
 Eupithecia phoeniceata, cypress pug — south (uncommon)
 Eupithecia ultimaria, Channel Islands pug — south (uncommon)
 Eupithecia lariciata, larch pug — throughout
 Eupithecia tantillaria, dwarf pug — throughout

 Chloroclystis v-ata, v-pug — throughout

 Pasiphila chloerata, sloe pug — south & central
 Pasiphila rectangulata, green pug — throughout
 Pasiphila debiliata, bilberry pug — south & west (Nationally Scarce B)
 Gymnoscelis rufifasciata, double-striped pug — throughout
 Anticollix sparsata, dentated pug — south & central (Nationally Scarce A)
 Chesias legatella, streak — throughout (Vulnerable) ‡*
 Chesias rufata, broom-tip (Vulnerble) ‡*
 Chesias rufata rufata — south-east & west (Nationally Scarce B)
 Chesias rufata scotica — north (Nationally Scarce B)
 Carsia sororiata anglica, Manchester treble-bar — north & central (Nationally Scarce B)
 Aplocera plagiata, treble bar 
 Aplocera plagiata plagiata — throughout
 Aplocera plagiata scotica — north
 Aplocera efformata, lesser treble-bar —south & central 
 Aplocera praeformata, purple treble-bar — probable immigrant (2 records)
 Odezia atrata, chimney sweeper — north, central & south 
 Lithostege griseata, grey carpet — east (Red Data Book) ‡
 Discoloxia blomeri, Blomer's rivulet — south, central & west (Nationally Scarce B)
 Venusia cambrica, Welsh wave — west & north (localized)
 Euchoeca nebulata, dingy shell — south & central (localized)
 Asthena albulata, small white wave — throughout
 Hydrelia flammeolaria, small yellow wave — throughout
 Hydrelia sylvata, waved carpet — west, south-east & south-west (Nationally Scarce B)
 Minoa murinata, drab looper — west, south & south-west (Nationally Scarce B) ‡
 Lobophora halterata, seraphim — throughout
 Trichopteryx polycommata, barred tooth-striped — throughout (Nationally Scarce A) ‡
 Trichopteryx carpinata, early tooth-striped — throughout
 Pterapherapteryx sexalata, small seraphim — throughout
 Acasis viretata, yellow-barred brindle — south, central & north-west (localized)

 Abraxas grossulariata, magpie moth — throughout
 Abraxas sylvata, clouded magpie — south & central (localized)
 [Abraxas pantaria, light magpie — unconfirmed old record]
 Lomaspilis marginata, clouded border — throughout
 Ligdia adustata, scorched carpet — south & central (localized)
 Stegania trimaculata, Dorset cream wave — rare immigrant
 Stegania cararia, ringed border — rare immigrant
 Macaria notata, peacock moth — south, west-central & north-west (localized)

 Macaria alternata, sharp-angled peacock — south & central (localized)
 Macaria signaria, dusky peacock — immigrant
 [Macaria bicolorata praeatomata, dingy angle — dubious very old record]
 Macaria liturata, tawny-barred angle — throughout
 Macaria carbonaria, netted mountain moth — north-east (Red Data Book) ‡
 Macaria wauaria, v-moth — throughout (localized) ‡*
 Chiasmia clathrata clathrata, latticed heath — south, central & north (Vulnerable) ‡*
 Itame brunneata, Rannoch looper — north-east (Nationally Scarce A)
 [Hypagyrtis unipunctata, white spot — dubious very old record]
 Isturgia limbaria, frosted yellow — presumed extinct
 [Nematocampa limbata, bordered chequer — dubious very old record]
 Cepphis advenaria, little thorn — west & south (not south-west) (Nationally Scarce B)
 Petrophora chlorosata, brown silver-line — throughout
 Plagodis pulveraria, barred umber — throughout (localized)

 Plagodis dolabraria, scorched wing — throughout (localized)
 Pachycnemia hippocastanaria, horse chestnut — south & east-central (Nationally Scarce B)
 Opisthograptis luteolata, brimstone moth — throughout
 Epione repandaria, bordered beauty — throughout
 Epione vespertaria, dark bordered beauty — north-east (Red Data Book) ‡
 Pseudopanthera macularia, speckled yellow — throughout
 Apeira syringaria, lilac beauty — south & central (localized)
 Ennomos autumnaria, large thorn — south-east (Nationally Scarce B)
 Ennomos quercinaria, August thorn — south & central (localized) (Vulnerable) ‡*
 Ennomos alniaria, canary-shouldered thorn — throughout
 Ennomos fuscantaria, dusky thorn — south & central (Endangered) ‡*
 Ennomos erosaria, September thorn — south, central & north (Endangered) ‡*
 [Ennomos quercaria, clouded August thorn — unconfirmed records]
 [Ennomos subsignaria — probable import]

 Selenia dentaria, early thorn — throughout
 Selenia lunularia, lunar thorn — throughout (localized)
 Selenia tetralunaria, purple thorn — south, central & north 
 Odontopera bidentata, scalloped hazel — throughout
 Crocallis elinguaria, scalloped oak — throughout
 Ourapteryx sambucaria, swallow-tailed moth — throughout
 Colotois pennaria, feathered thorn — throughout
 Angerona prunaria, orange moth — south (localized)
 Apocheima hispidaria, small brindled beauty — south & central (localized)
 Apocheima pilosaria, pale brindled beauty — throughout
 Lycia hirtaria, brindled beauty — south, central & north (Vulnerable) ‡*
 Lycia zonaria, belted beauty
 Lycia zonaria britannica — west-central (Red Data Book)
 Lycia zonaria atlantica — north-west (Nationally Scarce A)
 Lycia lapponaria scotica, Rannoch brindled beauty — north (Nationally Scarce A)
 Biston strataria, oak beauty — south, central & north

 Biston betularia, peppered moth — throughout
 Agriopis leucophaearia, spring usher — throughout
 Agriopis aurantiaria, scarce umber — throughout
 Agriopis marginaria, dotted border — throughout
 Erannis defoliaria, mottled umber — throughout
 Menophra abruptaria, waved umber — south & central
 Peribatodes rhomboidaria, willow beauty — south, central & north
 Peribatodes secundaria, feathered beauty — south-east (uncommon on alien Norway spruce)
 Peribatodes ilicaria, Lydd beauty — rare immigrant to south-east
 Selidosema brunnearia scandinaviaria, bordered grey — south, west-central, north-west & north-east (Nationally Scarce A)
 Cleora cinctaria, ringed carpet
 Cleora cinctaria bowesi — north-west & west-central (Nationally Scarce A)
 Cleora cinctaria cinctaria — south (Nationally Scarce A)
 Deileptenia ribeata, satin beauty — throughout
 Alcis repandata, mottled beauty 
 Alcis repandata repandata — throughout
 Alcis repandata sodorensium — Hebrides
 Alcis jubata, dotted carpet — west & north (localized)
 Hypomecis roboraria, great oak beauty — south & central (Nationally Scarce B)
 Hypomecis punctinalis, pale oak beauty — south
 Cleorodes lichenaria, Brussels lace — west, west-central, south & north (localized)
 Fagivorina arenaria, speckled beauty — extinct
 Ectropis bistortata, engrailed — throughout
 Ectropis crepuscularia, small engrailed — south, central & north (localized)
 Paradarisa consonaria, square spot — south & west (localized)
 Parectropis similaria, brindled white-spot — south (localized)
 Aethalura punctulata, grey birch — south, central & north

 Ematurga atomaria, common heath — throughout
 Tephronia sepiaria, dusky carpet — probable immigrant
 Bupalus piniaria, bordered white — throughout
 Cabera pusaria, common white wave — throughout
 Cabera exanthemata, common wave — throughout
 Lomographa bimaculata, white-pinion spotted — south & west-central
 Lomographa temerata, clouded silver — south, central & north
 Aleucis distinctata, sloe carpet — south-east & south (Nationally Scarce B) ‡
 Theria primaria, early moth — south, central & north

 Campaea margaritata, light emerald — throughout
 Hylaea fasciaria, barred red — throughout
 Gnophos obfuscata, Scotch (Scottish) annulet — north (Nationally Scarce B)
 Charissa obscurata, annulet — throughout
 Glacies coracina, black mountain moth — north (Nationally Scarce A)
 Siona lineata, black-veined moth — south-east (Red Data Book) ‡
 Aspitates gilvaria gilvaria, straw belle — south-east (Red Data Book) ‡
 Semiaspilates ochrearia, yellow belle — south (localized)
 Dyscia fagaria, grey scalloped bar — throughout (localized)
 Perconia strigillaria, grass wave — throughout (localized)

Species listed in the 2007 UK Biodiversity Action Plan (BAP) are indicated by a double-dagger symbol (‡)—species so listed for research purposes only are also indicated with an asterisk (‡*).

See also
List of moths of Great Britain (overview)
Family lists: Hepialidae, Cossidae, Zygaenidae, Limacodidae, Sesiidae, Lasiocampidae, Saturniidae, Endromidae, Drepanidae, Thyatiridae, Geometridae, Sphingidae, Notodontidae, Thaumetopoeidae, Lymantriidae, Arctiidae, Ctenuchidae, Nolidae, Noctuidae and Micromoths

References 

 Waring, Paul, Martin Townsend and Richard Lewington (2003) Field Guide to the Moths of Great Britain and Ireland. British Wildlife Publishing, Hook, UK. .

Moths of Great Britain (Geometridae)
Moths
Britain
Great Britain